The 51st New York Film Festival was held September 27 – October 13, 2013.

The lineup consisted of eight sections:
 Main Slate (36 films and four shorts programs)
 Spotlight on Documentary (21 films)
 Emerging Artists (six films)
 Views from the Avant-Garde (45 programs)
 Special Events (three films)
 Revivals (11 films)
 Jean-Luc Godard Retrospective (54 films and six shorts programs)
 Convergence (transmedia presentations and talks)
The Festival also included talks with Richard Curtis, James Gray, Paul Greengrass, Agnieszka Holland, and Frederick Wiseman. It was the first edition of the Festival following the retirement of longtime festival Director Richard Peña, succeeded by Kent Jones. The lineup saw a larger Main Slate selection than prior years, the addition of the documentary and "Emerging Artists" sections, and the renaming of the previous "Masterworks" program as "Revivals". The primary selection committee included Kent Jones (chair), Dennis Lim, Marian Masone, Gavin Smith, and Amy Taubin. The Godard retrospective was programmed by Kent Jones and Jake Perlin, and Views from the Avant-Garde was programmed by Mark McElhatten. Convergence was curated by Matt Bolish and Eugene Hernandez.

Sections

Main Slate

Feature-length

Shorts

Spotlight on Documentary

Applied Science

How Democracy Works Now

Motion Portraits

Emerging Artists

Special Events

Revivals

Retrospective

Feature-length and paired shorts

Shorts

References

New York Film Festival
2013 festivals in the United States
2013 film festivals
2013 in New York City